This article concerns the period 619 BC – 610 BC.

Events and trends
619 BC—Death of Ji Zheng, King of the Zhou Dynasty of China.
618 BC—Silphium discovered in Cyrene according to Theophrastus.
618 BC—Ji Renchen becomes King of the Zhou Dynasty of China.
616 BC—Lucius Tarquinius Priscus becomes the fifth King of Rome.
615 BC—Neo-Babylonian kingdom begin attacking Assyrian cities.
614 BC—Sack of Assur by the Medes and Babylonians.
613 BC—Death of Ji Renchen, King of the Zhou Dynasty of China.
613 BC—King Zhuang of Chu ascends to the throne of Chu in China
612 BC—Ji Ban becomes King of the Zhou Dynasty of China.
612 BC—An alliance of Medes, Persians, Scythians, Neo-Babylonians and Susianians besiege and conquer Nineveh at the Battle of Nineveh. King Sin-shar-ishkun of Assyria is killed in the sack.
612 BC—Ashur-uballit II attempts to keep the Assyrian empire alive by establishing himself as king at Harran.
612 BC—Estimation: Babylon, capital of Babylonia becomes the largest city of the world, taking the lead from Nineveh, capital of Assyria.
612 BC—Fall of the Assyrian Empire and Rise of the Neo-Babylonian Empire.
610 BC—Necho II succeeds Psamtik I (Psammetichus) as king of Egypt.
610 BC—Foundation of Naucratis

Significant people
 610 BC—Birth of Anaximander, Greek philosopher (approximate date)
 610 BC—Death of Psammetichus I, king of Egypt
 612 BC—Death of King Sin-shar-ishkun of Assyria

References